The year 2010 is the ninth year in the history of Cage Warriors, a mixed martial arts promotion based in the United Kingdom. In 2010 Cage Rage Championships held 3 events beginning with, Cage Warriors 37: Right to Fight.

Events list

Cage Warriors 37: Right to Fight

Cage Warriors 37: Right to Fight was an event held on May 22, 2010 in Birmingham, England.

Results

Cage Warriors 38: Young Guns

Cage Warriors 38: Young Guns was an event held on October 1, 2010 in London, England.

Results

Cage Warriors 39: The Uprising

Cage Warriors 39: The Uprising was an event held on November 27, 2010 in Cork, Ireland.

Results

See also 
 Cage Warriors

References

Cage Warriors events
2010 in mixed martial arts